A seascraper, also known as a waterscraper, is a proposed large building which will function as a floating city.  It would generate its own energy through wave, wind, current, solar, etc. and produce its own food through farming, aquaculture, hydroponics, etc. The term "Seascraper" is an analogous derivative of "Skyscraper".

Architect Koen Othuis of the Netherlands specializes in "amphibious" buildings, some floating and some using other systems to adapt to wet environments. In 2010 Architect Sarly Adre Sarkum of Malaysia from architecture firm SA Squared or Sarly Adre Sarkum Architecture proposed a building about the size of the Empire State Building which would float in the ocean with only the top few stories out of water. It would house thousands of people and be self-contained, growing its own food and generating its own energy.

Another design concept for a mostly submerged structure is The Gyre-Seascraper, which would stretch 400 meters deep and over a kilometer across. It is designed to house over 2000 people, and be completely self-sufficient, producing its own food and electricity.  It was designed by the firm Zigloo.ca, as a submission to eVolo's Skyscraper Design Competition in 2009.

A seascraper concept was proposed and described by William Erwin and Dan Fletcher in the 2009 Evolo Skyscraper Competition, where they stated,

See also 
 Freedom Ship
 Ocean colonization
 Seasteading
 Very large floating structure

References

External links
 "The Water-Scraper: I would live on it without a huge eco-disaster" - Coolest Gadgets
 "Gorgeous waterscrapers: habitat for the coming Waterworld" - DVICE
"Gyre SeaScraper Design Concept" - Zigloo.ca

Skyscrapers
Scraper
Building types